Anna Jansdochter Muggen (d. 1608), was an alleged Dutch witch. She was the last person to be executed for witchcraft in Holland, then the most influential province of the Netherlands. She has been referred to as the last person to be executed for witchcraft in the Netherlands. 

Anna Muggen lived in Gorinchem and was married to a man who died during the Eighty Year's War. After his death, she appears to have secluded herself from company, lived alone and often behaved aggressively with people. 

In April 1608, she had a row with a shoemaker, and cursed him after a disagreement of price. The shoemaker reported her to the authorities for sorcery because of her curse, and she was arrested and put on trial. The trial was very swift, as Anna Muggen reportedly freely admitted her guilt. She was sentenced guilty as charged to be executed with strangulation on 29 May 1608, after which her body was to be burned on the stake. On the day of her execution, she cursed the city and said that it would rain upon it eternally. When it started to rain after her execution, therefore, many became afraid and reportedly, some people also fled from town. 

Anna Muggen has often been referred to as the last person to be executed for witchcraft in the Netherlands. The last person to be judged guilty of witchcraft in the Netherlands, Aagt Germonts was given their sentence in 1660, however, but was punished with pillorying rather than death.

References
 W. F. Emck, Kroniek van Gorinchem. Geschiedkundige en andere aanteekeningen in chronologische volgorde 1230-1927, Gorinchem 1929, p. 68.
 Hans de Waardt, Sorcery and society, Holland 1500-1800, 1991
 http://www.rijnmond.nl/nieuws/118518/De-Heks-van-de-Helmsteeg
 http://www.vergetenverhalen.nl/2015/09/21/de-heks-van-de-helmsteeg/

1608 deaths
17th-century executions by the Netherlands
People executed for witchcraft
Witch trials in the Netherlands